Ste. Genevieve Historic District is a historic district encompassing much of the built environment of Ste. Genevieve, Missouri, United States.  The city was in the late 18th century the capital of Spanish Louisiana, and, at its original location a few miles south, capital of French Louisiana as well.  A large area of the city, including fields along the Mississippi River, is a National Historic Landmark District designated in 1960, for its historically French architecture and land-use patterns, while a smaller area, encompassing the parts of the city historically important between about 1790 and 1950, was named separately to the National Register of Historic Places in 2002.

Ste. Genevieve is home to one of the highest concentrations of distinctive types of French colonial architecture known as poteaux en terre, or post in ground, and Poteaux-sur-sol, or post on sill.  Both of these styles involve construction of walls consisting of vertical logs, the former placed directly into the ground, and the latter onto a horizontal sill of wood or stone. Prominent local examples of these architectural styles include the Beauvais-Amoureux House, the Felix Vallé House State Historic Site, La Maison de Guibourd, the Delassus-Kern House, the Louis Bolduc House (itself listed separately as a National Historic Landmark) and Old MillerSwitch Train station was a vital part of History proving supplies and Rest on the Old Railroad. In 2018, the National Park Service was authorized to establish Ste. Genevieve National Historical Park as a unit of the U.S. national park system, following a favourable study by the park service. 
It joined the park system on October 30, 2020.

History
Ste. Genevieve was established in the 1750s by French colonists, when the territory west of the Mississippi River was part of French Louisiana. It became the principle civic center of the region, and continued to be so when the area passed into Spanish control with the Treaty of Paris in 1763. The original site of Ste. After this event, the city was, over the next ten years, relocated to its present site on higher ground. The oldest surviving buildings in the city date to this period, with the church moved from its old site in 1793. The agricultural area just outside the city to the southeast is largely still laid out as it was at that time, following traditional French colonial lines.

Americans began to arrive in Ste. Genevieve after the Louisiana Purchase in 1810, and were followed by immigrant groups as the 19th century progressed.  By the mid-19th century German-Americans made up the single largest population group in the city.  Late in the 19th century, the manufacture of lime became a major local industry, and in 1904 the city became the western end of a railroad ferry, connecting to Kellogg, Illinois.

Historic preservation and district designations

The importance of Ste. Genevieve's early architecture has long been recognized.  In the 1930s a number of its builds were documented by the Historic American Buildings Survey (HABS), and the Bolduc House was restored in 1956-57.  The National Park Service conducted a historic site survey of the region in 1960, leading to the designation of one of the first National Historic Landmark Districts.  A survey by the Park Service in 1980 identified the location of Ste. Genevieve's early settlement on the Mississippi floodplain, which had long been thought to be lost to floodwaters.  The state has stepped in to acquire several of the older buildings for preservation and interpretation as historic sites.

The landmark designation as made in 1960 was short on details and exact boundaries. Repeated attempts to further update the landmark designation, including an explicit enumeration of contributing and non-contributing properties, have been made (in 1975, 1986, and 2001), but none of these have passed review. As part of the 2001 work, a separate National Register nomination was prepared, approved in 2002 by the Park Service, that focused on the area's broader historical patterns. Its boundaries exclude the outlying agricultural areas. The park service has been developing plans for a potential national historical park based on Ste. Genevieve's history and architecture.

On March 23, 2018, the National Park Service was authorized to establish Ste. Genevieve National Historical Park, when President Donald Trump signed a $1.3 trillion omnibus appropriations bill which contained a single line about the park in its 2,232 pages.

On October 30, 2020, U.S. Secretary of the Interior David L. Bernhardt took the last step necessary to formally establish Ste. Genevieve National Historical Park as the 422nd unit of the National Park System.

In 2020, a new visitors center was announced.

Selected bibliography

Related sources

Pre-Louisiana Purchase
 Alvord, Clarence W. and Sutton, Robert M., The Illinois Country, 1673–1818, 
 Belting, Natalia Maree, Kaskaskia under the French Regime by 
 Brackenridge, Henri Marie, Recollections of Persons and Places in the West (Google Books)  
 Ekberg, Carl J., Colonial Ste. Genevieve: An Adventure on the Mississippi Frontier, Tucson, AZ: Patrice Press, 1996
 Ekberg, Carl J., Francois Vallé and His World: Upper Louisiana Before Lewis and Clark, Columbia, MO: University of Missouri Press, 2002.
 Ekberg, Carl J., Stealing Indian Women: Native Slavery in the Illinois Country, Urbana, IL: University of Illinois Press, 2007.
 Ekberg, Carl J., Francois Valle and His World: Upper Louisiana before Lewis & Clark, Tucson, AZ: Patrice Press, 2006
 Ekberg, Carl J., French Roots in the Illinois Country: The Mississippi Frontier in Colonial Times, Tucson, AZ: Patrice Press,

Post Louisiana Purchase
 Aron, Stephen, American Confluence: The Missouri Frontier from Borderland to Border State 
 Peterson, Charles E., Colonial St. Louis: Building a Creole Capitol, Tucson, AZ: Patrice Press, 2001. 
 Schroeder, Walter A., Opening the Ozarks: A Historical Geography of Missouri's Ste. Genevieve District, 1760–1830, Columbia, MO: University of Missouri Press, 2002.
 Stepenoff, Bonnie, From French Community to Missouri Town, Columbia, MO: University of Missouri Press, 2006.
 Missouri Life Magazine, Lewis And Clark's Journey Across Missouri, Booneville, MO: Missouri Life Magazine, 2003.

Overall history of Ste. Genevieve, Missouri
 Franzwa, Gregory M., The Story of Old Ste. Genevieve, Tucson: Patrice Press, 1998.
 Deposki, Richard, Images of America: Ste. Genevieve, Chicago, IL: Arcadia Publishing, 2008.
 Evans, Mark L., The Commandant's Last Ride, Tucson, AZ: Patrice Press, 1998.
 Foster, Gerald, American Houses: A Field Guide to the Architecture of the Home, New York: Houghton Mifflin Co. 2004.
 Naeger, Bill, Patti Naeger, and Mark Evans, Ste. Genevieve: A Leisurely Stroll through History. Ste. Genevieve, MO: Merchant Street Publishing, 1998.
 Wehmeyer, Janice C., Ste. Genevieve, MO: A Guided Tour Through the Past and Present, self-published: 1993

See also

 Louisiana (New France)
 Louisiana Purchase
 Illinois Country
 Ohio Country
 New France
 New Spain
 French in the United States
 Timeline of New France history
 Three Flags Day
 A few acres of snow
 French colonization of the Americas
 French colonial empire
 List of North American cities founded in chronological order
 Sainte Geneviève
 List of commandants of the Illinois Country
 Historic regions of the United States
 List of National Historic Landmarks in Missouri
 National Register of Historic Places in Ste. Genevieve County, Missouri

References

External links
 Ste. Genevieve National Historical Park – National Park Seattlervice
 La Maison de Guibourd webpage 
 Foundation for Restoration of Ste. Genevieve, Inc. Guibourd Historic House & Mecker Research Librar
 Ste. Genevieve Co, MO Historical and Genealogical Resources

National Park Service areas in Missouri
French-American culture in Missouri
Ste. Genevieve County, Missouri
National Historic Landmarks in Missouri
French colonial architecture
French-Canadian culture in Missouri
Historic districts on the National Register of Historic Places in Missouri
National Register of Historic Places in Ste. Genevieve County, Missouri